The Nutty Professor Soundtrack is the soundtrack to Tom Shadyac's 1996 comedy film The Nutty Professor. It was released in June 1996 via Def Jam Recordings, and contained hip hop and R&B music. 

The album fared well on the Billboard charts, peaking at #8 on the Billboard 200 and #1 on the Top R&B/Hip-Hop Albums and featured several charting singles: "Ain't Nobody" by Monica featuring Treach of Naughty By Nature, "I Like" by Montell Jordan featuring Slick Rick, "Ain't No Nigga" by Jay-Z featuring Foxy Brown, "Touch Me, Tease Me" by Case featuring Mary J. Blige and Foxy Brown and "Last Night" by Az Yet all made it to the charts with "Last Night" making it to #9 on the Billboard Hot 100. The two tracks "Come Around" by Dos of Soul and "My Crew Can't Go For That" by Trigger tha Gambler featuring DV Alias Khrist and Smoothe da Hustler. This is not actually the soundtrack to the film, but actually 'music inspired by' the film as stated on the reverse side of the CD. None of the tracks listed here appeared in the music credits of the film.

Track listing

Notes
 signifies a co-producer

Charts

Weekly

Year-end

Certifications

See also
List of Billboard number-one R&B albums of 1996

References

External links

1996 soundtrack albums
Hip hop soundtracks
Comedy film soundtracks
Albums produced by Jaz-O
Albums produced by Warren G
Contemporary R&B soundtracks
Albums produced by Cory Rooney
Def Jam Recordings soundtracks
Albums produced by 4th Disciple
Albums produced by Erick Sermon
Albums produced by Rashad Smith
Albums produced by Dallas Austin
Science fiction film soundtracks
Albums produced by DeVante Swing
Albums recorded at Chung King Studios
Albums produced by Babyface (musician)